Pseudodementia (otherwise known as depression-related cognitive dysfunction) is a condition where mental cognition can be temporarily decreased. The term pseudodementia is applied to the range of functional psychiatric conditions such as depression and schizophrenia, that may mimic organic dementia, but are essentially reversible on treatment. Pseudodementia typically involves three cognitive components: memory issues, deficits in executive functioning, and deficits in speech and language. Specific cognitive symptoms might include trouble recalling words or remembering things in general, decreased attentional control and concentration, difficulty completing tasks or making decisions, decreased speed and fluency of speech, and impaired processing speed. People with pseudodementia are typically very distressed about the cognitive impairment they experience. There are two specific treatments that have been found to be effective for the treatment of depression, and these treatments may also be beneficial in the treatment of pseudodementia. Cognitive behavioral therapy (CBT) involves exploring and changing thought patterns and behaviors in order to improve one's mood. Interpersonal therapy focuses on the exploration of an individual's relationships and identifying any ways in which they may be contributing to feelings of depression. Some antidepressant drugs have also been found to alleviate cognitive deficits arising from depression; in particular, the novel SSRI vortioxetine has been studied for treating pseudodementia.

Presentation 
The history of disturbance in pseudodementia is often short and abrupt onset, while dementia is more often insidious. Clinically, people with pseudodementia differ from those with true dementia when their memory is tested. They will often answer that they don't know the answer to a question, and their attention and concentration are often intact. They may appear upset or distressed, and those with true dementia will often give wrong answers, have poor attention and concentration, and appear indifferent or unconcerned. The symptoms of depression oftentimes mimic dementia even though it may be co-occurring.

Causes 
Pseudodementia refers to "behavioral changes that resemble those of the progressive degenerative dementias, but which are attributable to so-called functional causes". The main cause is depression.

Diagnosis

Differential diagnosis
The implementation and application of existing collaborative care models, such as DICE, can aid in avoiding misdiagnosis. Comorbidities (such as vascular, infectious, traumatic, autoimmune, idiopathic, or even becoming malnourished) have the potential to mimic symptoms of dementia. For instance, studies have also shown a relationship between depression and its cognitive effects on everyday functioning and distortions of memory.

Investigations such as PET and SPECT imaging of the brain show reduced blood flow in areas of the brain in people with Alzheimer's disease (AD) compared with a more normal blood flow in those with pseudodementia, and the MRI shows medial temporal lobe atrophy in people with AD.

Pseudodementia vs. dementia 
Pseudodementia symptoms can appear similar to dementia. Due to the similar side effects to dementia, this can result in a misdiagnosis of depression, or the adverse effects of medications being taken. This form of dementia is not the original form and does not result from the same cognitive changes. Once the depression is properly treated or the medication therapy is changed, the cognitive impairment can be effectively reversed. Generally, dementia involves a steady and irreversible cognitive decline but in some cases there may be different outcomes. In addition, diminished mental capacity and social withdrawal are commonly identified as symptoms in the elderly but oftentimes is due to symptoms of depression. As a result, elderly patients are often misdiagnosed especially when healthcare professionals do not make an accurate assessment.

Older people with predominantly cognitive symptoms such as loss of memory, and vagueness, as well as prominent slowing of movement and reduced or slowed speech, were sometimes misdiagnosed as having dementia when further investigation showed they were suffering from a major depressive episode. This was an important distinction as the former was untreatable and progressive and the latter treatable with antidepressant therapy, electroconvulsive therapy, or both. In contrast to major depression, dementia is a progressive neurodegenerative syndrome involving a pervasive impairment of higher cortical functions resulting from widespread brain pathology.

A significant overlap in cognitive and neuropsychological dysfunction in Dementia and pseudodementia patients increases the difficulty in diagnosis. Differences in the severity of impairment and quality of patients' responses can be observed, and a test of antisaccadic movements may be used to differentiate the two, as pseudodementia patients have poorer performance on this test. Individuals with pseudodementia present considerable cognitive deficits, including disorders in learning, memory and psychomotor performance. Substantial evidences from brain imaging such as CT scanning and positron emission tomography (PET) have also revealed abnormalities in brain structure and function.

A comparison between dementia and pseudodementia is shown below.

Treatments 
If effective medical treatment for depression is given, this can aid in the distinction between pseudodementia and dementia. Antidepressants have been found to assist in the elimination of cognitive dysfunction associated with depression, whereas cognitive dysfunction associated with true dementia continues along a steady gradient. In cases where antidepressant therapy is not well tolerated, patients can consider electroconvulsive therapy as a possible alternative. However, studies have revealed that patients who displayed cognitive dysfunction related to depression eventually developed dementia later on in their lives.

The development of treatments for dementia has not been as fast as those for depression. Thus far, cholinesterase inhibitors are the most popular drug used to slow the progression of the Alzheimer's disease (most frequent dementia) and improves cognitive function for a period of time.

Vortioxetine, an SSRI with a novel pharmacology recently approved for major depressive disorder, has emerged as a promising potential treatment for the cognitive symptoms of depression. In preclinical animal studies and in large-scale randomized controlled trials, vortioxetine has been found to significantly improve cognition in remitted depressed patients, independent of its antidepressant effect. In clinical trials, significant improvements were identified in working memory, processing speed, executive function and attention in participants treated with vortioxetine. MRI studies showed that vortioxetine modulates a circuit subserving working memory, in a direction opposite to changes observed in major depression. Studies also showed that vortioxetine stimulates growth of dendritic spines and synaptic connections in vitro, and stimulates gene expression of factors involved in neuroplasticity, hinting at possible biological mechanisms underlying its pro-cognitive effects in both depressed patients and healthy controls.

History
The term was first coined in 1961 by psychiatrist Leslie Kiloh, who noticed patients with cognitive symptoms consistent with dementia who improved with treatment. Reversible causes of true dementia must be excluded. His term was mainly descriptive. The clinical phenomenon, however, was well-known since the late 19th century as melancholic dementia.

Doubts about the classification and features of the syndrome, and the misleading nature of the name, led to proposals that the term be dropped. However, proponents argue that although it is not a defined singular concept with a precise set of symptoms, it is a practical and useful term which has held up well in clinical practice, and also highlights those who may have a treatable condition.

References

Further reading 

 

Aging-associated diseases
Mood disorders
Psychopathological syndromes